Sudhir Pandey is an Indian film and serial television actor. His father was famous Akashwani news reader Devki Nandan Pandey.

Selected filmography

Films

 Shaan (1980) as Tiwari
 Chakra (1981) as Bhandari
 Dhuan (1981) as Inspector pandey
 Aagaman (1982)
Do Dishayen (1982) as Swamiji
 Yeh Nazdeekiyan (1982) as Rajesh
 Shakti (1982) as manohar
Kalka (1983 film) as Bacchu Singh
Prerana (1984) as Birju
 Maati Maangey Khoon (1984) as Ram Singh
Vivek (1985)
Paththar (1985) as Hiralal
Surkhiyaan (1985) as Mishra
Pighalta Aasman (1985) as Lala Karan Singh Rathod
Saagar (1985)
Jhanjaar (1986) as Nagoji
Mera Dharam (1986) 
Uprant (1987)
Diljalaa (1987) as Shyam
Mere Baad (1988) as Doctor
Andha Yudh (1988) as Sampatrao Mahadik
Waaris (1988) as Thanna Singh
Sagar Sangam (1988) CID Inspector jaishanker
Hum To Chale Pardes (1988) as Doctor
Dayavan (1988) as Chhote Anna
JailKhana (1989) - Dinu, Prisoner in Jail
 Salim Langde Pe Mat Ro (1989)
Elaan-E-Jung (1989)
 Gola Barood (1989) - Insp. Mahender Nath
 Kala Bazaar (1989) - Mun. sutlpdt. Thakur
 Bhrashtachar (1989) - Phatte dada
 Main Azaad Hoon (1989) - Gulapchand (Prime minister)
Jurrat (1989) - Police Inspector pandey
Abu Kaliya (1990)
Teri Talash Mein (1990) Police Inspector Dinesh
Naag Nagin (1990) - Aguri
 College Girl (1990) Digvijay Singh
 Agneepath (1990) Police Inspector PathanAwwal Number (1990) SundaramTum Mere Ho (1990) Thakur ChaudharyAmba (1990) Thakur Jasbir SinghHatyarin (1991)Kasam Kali Ki (1991)Maut Ki Sazaa (1991) as Pandit MatadinKhoon Ka Karz (1991) Hariya
 Benaam Badsha (1991) as Abhinandan TiwariBanjaran (1991) as Sardar Malik, Tribal Leader
 Dil Hi To Hai (1992 film) as KamaniAakanksha (1993) as Thakur Mehtab SinghKhoon Ka Sindoor (1993)Sahibaan (1993) as Inder GuideRakhwale (1994) as Din DayalPaandav  (1995) as Police Commissioner J.K.SrivastavVeergati (1995) as Police Commissioner Hahakaar (1996)Gehra Raaz (1996)

 Family Of Thakurganj Batti Gul Meter Chalu A Daughter's Tale Pankh Ajji Toilet: Ek Prem Katha as Pandit Vimalnath Sharma 
 Ekkees Toppon Ki Salaami Issaq Dekh Tamasha Dekh Bombay Talkies Journey Bombay to Goa as Charandas
 Tees Maar Khan as Bunty Baweja
 Karzzzz (2008) - John 
 Anwar Matrubhoomi Haasil Main Madhuri Dixit Banna Chahti Hoon Veergati Khooni Panja Dayavan Insan Jhanjhaar Saagar Yeh Nazdeekiyan Love You Loktantra (film) ShaktiTelevision

 Phir Bhi Dil Hai Hindustani The Sword of Tipu Sultan 
 Maayka Sasural Genda Phool - Ambarnath Kashyap
 Balika Vadhu - Premkishore
 Dekho Magar Pyaar Se Hum Saath Aath Hain Yeh Shaadi Nahin Ho Sakti - Golcha
 Hum Sab Ek Hain (1999-2001) - Brigadier K. K. Khachroo (after replacing Jatin Kanakia)
 Bombay Blue Kareena Kareena Tanha Mera Sasural Mahabharata Amanat - Lala Lahori Ram
 Gunwale Dulhania Le Jayenge Humko Tumse Ho Gaya Hai Pyaar Kya Kare Buniyaad - Lala Gaindamal
 Belan Wali Bahu - Rajnath Awasthi
 Ishaaron Ishaaron Mein - Om Shrivastava
 Zindagi Mere Ghar Aana - Shukhbeer Sakhuja
 Sasural Genda Phool 2''  - Ambarnath Kashyap

References

External links

Living people
1945 births
Male actors in Hindi cinema
21st-century Indian male actors
Indian male film actors
Male actors from Uttarakhand